In crystallography, short range order refers to the regular and predictable arrangement (i.e. crystalline lattice) of atoms over a short distance, usually with one or two atom spacings. However, this regularity does not persist over a long distance. Examples of materials with short range order include amorphous materials such as wax, glass and liquids as well as the collagen fibrils of the stroma in the cornea.

Besides ordering of atoms, short-range ordering of vacancies are also possible. Example of systems with short-range ordering of oxygen-vacancies include oxygen-deficient stoichiometries of the superconductors , ; as well as perovskites and novel bismuth sillenites.

See also 
 Order and disorder
 Structure of liquids and glasses

References 

Statistical mechanics